The women's discus throw event at the 1954 British Empire and Commonwealth Games was held on 7 July at the Empire Stadium in Vancouver, Canada. It was the first time that women contested this event at the Games.

Results

References

Athletics at the 1954 British Empire and Commonwealth Games
1954